The Hunchback of Notre Dame II is a 2002 American animated musical film directed by Bradley Raymond. The direct-to-video sequel to the 1996 Disney film The Hunchback of Notre Dame, the film was produced by Walt Disney Animation (Japan), Inc., Walt Disney Television International Japan and Walt Disney Television Animation. Critical reception was mostly negative.

Plot
Some years after the events of the original film, Captain Phoebus serves as Paris' Captain of the Guard under the new Minister of Justice, while he and Esmeralda are now married and have a son named Zephyr. Quasimodo is now an accepted member of Parisian society, though he still lives in Notre-Dame de Paris with his gargoyle friends Victor, Hugo, and Laverne as the cathedral's bell-ringer.

A circus troupe led by Sarousch enters town as part of "Le Jour d'Amour" ("The Day of Love"), a day dedicated to the celebration of strong and pure romantic love. Sarousch is secretly a master criminal who plans to steal Notre Dame's most beloved bell, La Fidèle, the inside of which is decorated with beige-gold and enormous jewels. He sends Madellaine, an aspiring trapeze girl in his troupe, to go to Quasimodo and pretend to love him in order to discover the whereabouts of La Fidèle.

Madellaine encounters Quasimodo without seeing his face, and the two of them initially get along quite well. Once Madellaine actually sees his face, she is shocked at his deformed appearance and runs away from him. The gargoyles convince Quasimodo to go to the circus to see her again. At the circus, Sarousch captures the audience's attention by making an elephant disappear, while his associates steal from the audience. He pressures Madellaine to follow Quasimodo and obtain the information he needs for his plans. When Madellaine disagrees with this mission, Sarousch reminds her of her past and of the loyalty she owes him: when she was six years old, Madellaine was an orphaned thief who was caught trying to steal coins from Sarousch. He could have turned her over to the authorities or even Frollo; instead, Sarousch took her under his wing and decided to employ her in his circus.

Madellaine reluctantly takes the mission to win Quasimodo's trust. After observing Quasimodo fondly playing with Zephyr around town and letting the boy sleep in his arms, Madellaine realizes the hunchback's true nature and ceases to be frightened by his appearance. Quasimodo takes her sight-seeing around Paris. A thunderstorm and the rain force them to end their date and return to Notre Dame. Quasimodo takes the opportunity to offer Madellaine a gift, a figurine in her own image which he created himself earlier. A sincerely touched Madellaine kisses him on the forehead and leaves. Quasimodo soon realizes that he has fallen in love with her.

Meanwhile, Phoebus is investigating reports about robberies in his city. He suspects that the circus is responsible for the crime spree and confides to his family and friends, but Esmeralda expresses her belief that Phoebus is motivated by his own prejudice against the circus. Elsewhere, Sarousch instructs Madellaine to keep Quasimodo preoccupied while the circus steals La Fidèle. However, Madellaine has come to genuinely care for Quasimodo and protests, so Sarousch threatens to have Quasimodo killed if she refuses. Phoebus eventually questions Sarousch about the robberies and finds a stolen jewel in his possession. To avoid being arrested, Sarousch claims that Madellaine is a lifelong thief and that he is covering for her crimes. Phoebus seems to believe him.

Later, while Quasimodo is out with Madellaine, Sarousch and two of his subordinates sneak into the cathedral and steal La Fidèle, although they are followed by Djali and Zephyr, the latter of whom wanted to join the circus. The gargoyles try to stop the thieves, but end up trapped under another bell; Laverne still sounds the bell and alerts everyone that something is amiss at the cathedral. Hearing the sound, Quasimodo and Madellaine rush back. When the Archdeacon informs everyone that La Fidèle has been stolen, Clopin claims that if they do not find the bell, the festival will be ruined. Phoebus realizes that Sarousch has played him for a fool. He sends the soldiers all over Paris to find Sarousch. Quasimodo realizes that his beloved Madellaine has deceived him (despite her pleas that she did not intend to) and angrily breaks off their relationship. He retreats deeper into the cathedral, feeling heartbroken and betrayed.

Phoebus has his guards arrest Madellaine for her involvement in the theft. The gargoyles soon inform Quasimodo that Zephyr has left to pursue Sarousch. He passes the information on to Esmeralda and Phoebus, who now have personal reasons to locate the master criminal. Madellaine, now a prisoner of Phoebus, apologizes for her crimes and informs them that Sarousch has taken the missing bell to the Catacombs of Paris and tries to explain the secrets behind her former master's tricks and illusions. Phoebus decides to search around the catacombs, and reluctantly brings Madellaine after Esmeralda convinced him that she could change. In the Catacombs, the search party encounter Esmeralda's pet goat Djali, who leads them to Sarousch and Zephyr. Sarousch has taken the boy hostage and blackmails Phoebus into opening a gate for him. Madellaine pleads with Quasimodo to release her, promising to make up for her crimes. After he does, she uses her high-wire skills to rescue Zephyr and reunite him with his parents. With no leverage against his pursuers, Sarousch and his group of criminals are arrested, and the missing bell is recovered.

The festival can finally take place. Hugo finally wins the heart of Djali, his longtime crush. A number of romantic couples, including Phoebus and Esmeralda, proclaim their love for each other while Quasimodo rings the restored La Fidèle. The bell falls silent when a released Madellaine joins Quasimodo in the bell tower. The two of them admit their own love for each other and share their first romantic kiss, while Zephyr takes over ringing La Fidèle.

Voice cast
 Tom Hulce as Quasimodo, the hunchback of Notre Dame.
 Jennifer Love Hewitt as Madellaine, Quasimodo's love interest/girlfriend and a former thief and circus troupe member that Quasimodo falls for.
 Michael McKean as Sarousch, the leader of the circus troupe and the main villain of the film.
 Demi Moore as Esmeralda, a Romani woman and friend of Quasimodo.
 Kevin Kline as Captain Phoebus, a soldier, a friend of Quasimodo, and Esmeralda's husband who regained his captain status.
 Haley Joel Osment as Zephyr, the son of Esmeralda and Phoebus who befriends and assists Quasimodo.
 Paul Kandel as Clopin Trouillefou, the leader of the Roma.
 Charles Kimbrough as Victor, a gargoyle.
 Jason Alexander as Hugo, a comical gargoyle.
 Jane Withers as Laverne, a female gargoyle. This was Withers’ last film before her death.
 Jim Cummings as the Archdeacon, the lead priest at Notre Dame. He was previously voiced by David Ogden Stiers in the first film.
 Joe Lala as Guard #1
 Frank Welker as Achilles, Phoebus' horse. He was previously voiced by Bob Bergen in the first film.
 Frank Welker also voices Djali, Esmeralda's pet goat, replacing the late Mary Kay Bergman.
 April Winchell as Lady DeBurne

Home media
As announced on August 21, 2000, the film was originally going to be released on DVD and VHS on August 28, 2001. However, the release date was delayed to March 19, 2002 to coincide with the VHS/DVD re-release of the original film.

Reception
The review aggregator website Rotten Tomatoes reported that 22% of critics have given the film a positive review based on 9 reviews, with an average rating of 4/10.

DVDactive said it was an "unusually chintzy production", noting "the characters are slightly off-model, their movements are stilted, optical zooms are used in place of animated camera moves, animation cycles are over-used, and painted highlights float around between frames". It compared it to the company's television shows, adding it looks "cheap", "old", and "awful". It concluded by saying "it is mercifully short – under an hour without credits." Hi-Def Digest said "There's really no point in wasting your time watching this subpar sequel of an already ho-hum movie", rating it 1.5 stars. PopMatters notes "The Hunchback of Notre Dame II both addresses and cheapens the previous movie's notes of melancholy, as it sets about finding Quasimodo a romantic partner". DVD Talk says "the story...somehow stretches what might have once been a 12-minute segment of the Smurfs to over an hour", and concludes that "the whole thing has the awful feel of a cash grab".

Songs

This was the final film credit for Angela Morley who orchestrated Carl Johnson's score.

References

External links

 
 
 

2002 animated films
American romantic comedy-drama films
2002 direct-to-video films
2000s American animated films
American romantic musical films
2000s romantic musical films
Disney direct-to-video animated films
American sequel films
American children's animated comedy films
American children's animated musical films
Circus films
Direct-to-video sequel films
DisneyToon Studios animated films
Disney Television Animation films
Films about criminals
Films about theft
Films based on The Hunchback of Notre-Dame
Films directed by Bradley Raymond
Films set in the 1480s
American direct-to-video films
Animated films set in Paris
Films set in religious buildings and structures
The Hunchback of Notre Dame (franchise)
Cultural depictions of Louis XI of France
2002 romantic comedy-drama films
2000s children's animated films
Films set in the Middle Ages
Films about Romani people
2000s English-language films